Stixwould and Woodhall is a civil parish in the East Lindsey district of Lincolnshire, England. The civil parish population (including Langton near Horncastle) was 255 at the 2011 census.

The parish incorporates the villages of Stixwould and Old Woodhall or Woodhall.

References

Civil parishes in Lincolnshire
East Lindsey District